Filago vulgaris or Filago germanica, commonly known as common cudweed or common cottonrose, is an annual herbaceous plant of the genus Filago. It is in the tribe Inuleae of the 
sunflower family, Asteraceae. Common names also include: Danish—Kugle-museurt, and Norwegian—Kuleullurt.

Distribution
Filago vulgaris is native to Europe, from the Mediterranean region north to Northern Ireland, Scotland. It is found in grassland, sand dunes, rocky ledges, and cultivated fields. It is a listed Near Threatened species in the Red Data Book for England, due to agricultural practices.

It is an invasive species in Scandinavia and Finland. It is a naturalized introduced species in the Northwestern and Eastern United States, and in British Columbia and Ontario, Canada.

Description
Filago vulgaris can reach  in height. The linear wavy-edged leaves and the stems are a white and woolly in texture and appearance.

The plant blooms July to September, with dense, terminal flowerheads, flowers that are light yellow.

References

External links

Dorset Nature: Wildflowers — Common Cudweed (Filago vulgaris) — image gallery.
Bioinfo.org.uk: Feeding and other inter-species relationships
Bioinfo.org.uk: Images gallery — plant and flowers sections.
Filago vulgaris—U.C. photo

Gnaphalieae
Flora of Europe